Ollivant may refer to:

 Alfred Ollivant (disambiguation), several people
 Charles Ollivant (1846 - at least 1902), senior member of the Indian Civil Service
 Douglas Ollivant (born 1967), American academic and military adviser
 Ollivant Point, the westernmost point of Saunders Island, South Sandwich Islands

See also